Giuseppe Chialli (Città di Castello, 1800 – Rome, December 23, 1839) was an Italian sculptor.

He was the younger brother of the painter Vincenzo Chialli. He first studied in Rome under Antonio Canova, and moved in 1819 with Tommaso Minardi to Perugia. Afterwards, he was an assistant to Thorvaldsen. Among his works are a bas relief of the Judgement of Paris and  the statue of St Mark in the niche to the right of the entrance of the Church of Gran Madre di Dio, Turin.

References

1800 births
1839 deaths
19th-century Italian sculptors
Italian male sculptors
19th-century Italian male artists